Beverly Lynne is an American actress who is mainly showcased in erotic film.

Life and career
After attending Pennridge High School in Perkasie, Pennsylvania, she attended college. She was a cheerleader for the Philadelphia Eagles from 1998 to 2000. 

During her time in college, she appeared in Playboy's “Book of Lingerie” (March/April 1997 and March/April 1999) and her picture was printed on the cover of the cheerleading team's swimsuit-calendar. Later she went to Los Angeles to start working in the film business as an actress. She began her acting career in The Zombie Chronicles in 2001 and soon had appearances in Holy Terror, Terror Tunes, MadTV and several commercials.
After receiving the offer to play a leading part in Playboy TV's Personals 2: CasualSex.com she started appearing in several erotic movies airing in the late night hours of Cinemax, HBO, Showtime and others. Basing on her various roles in this genre she started using the title “Queen of Late Nite”. Cinemax's TV show Hollywood Sexcapades featured her together with her husband. She also appeared in recurring roles on 7 Lives Xposed as Bess, Black Tie Nights as Candi and the 2007 here! original series The Lair, playing "Laura".

Together with her husband she started her own business “BackUp Plan Productions” in 2007. They produced the web show Tanya X based on the character with the same name from the movie The Girl from B.I.K.I.N.I.. Meanwhile, the show was aired on Showtime. The company's first movie to be released is The Atonement of Janis Drake which was shown at PollyGrind Film Festival in 2011.

Filmography
 2005 Dangerous Sex Games
 2013 The Big Bust Theory
 2016 The Love Machine

Personal life
She is married to fellow actor Glen Meadows.

References

External links

 

1973 births
American cheerleaders
Living people
National Football League cheerleaders
American people of German descent
People from Sellersville, Pennsylvania